Francisco Villagrán is the name of:

Francisco Villagrán Kramer (1927–2011), vice president of Guatemala, 1978–1980
Francisco Villagrán Muñoz, Guatemalan politician, affiliated with the Guatemalan National Revolutionary Unity